St. Paul's United Methodist Church is a historic United Methodist church in Nyack, Rockland County, New York. It is a Romanesque church built in two sections over a 17-year period starting in 1894.  It is constructed of rusticated limestone with brownstone trim.

It was listed on the National Register of Historic Places in 2001.

References

Churches on the National Register of Historic Places in New York (state)
United Methodist churches in New York (state)
Churches in Rockland County, New York
National Register of Historic Places in Rockland County, New York